The Crimson Thread of Abandon is a collection of short fiction by Shūji Terayama, translated into English by Elizabeth L. Armstrong and published by the University of Hawai'i Press in 2013. The book contains a total of 20 stories. The stories in the first half of the book originate from the collection Stories Sewn Up with a Red Thread.

Robert Anthony Siegel wrote in Three Percent that the translation had a "graceful" approach to wordplay and puns, and that the translator did her task "with sensitivity and skill".

Stories

 "Ribbon of the Sea"
 "Bird in a Bottle"
 "Yesterday"
 "Memory Shot"
 "Gotta Dance"
 "The Eraser"
 "The Elusive Milena"
 "Remy's Quantum Realities"
 "One-Centimeter Journey"
 "Five Stories of Hide-and-Seek"
 "Alice in Shadowland"
 "Alice in Bookland"
 "Que Sera Sera"
 "24,000 Kisses"
 "The Thief's Tango"
 "Joker Joe"
 "Flame"
 "Hide-and-Not-Go-Seek"
 "Lena's Death"
 "Fallen Angel"

References

External links
 "The Crimson Thread of Abandon Stories." University of Hawai'i Press.

2013 short story collections
Japanese short story collections
University of Hawaiʻi Press books